Ignazio Cirri or Giacomo Matteo Ignazio Cirri (20 September 1711 – 13 July 1787) was an Italian organist and composer in the 18th century. He was the brother of composer Giovanni Battista Cirri and the father of composer and violoncellist Giovanni Battista Cirri (born 1740). He was born and died in Forlì (current Emilia-Romagna). He was a friend of Giovanni Battista Martini, who had a portrait of Ignazio Cirri among his valuable men's portraits. In 1759, he became Maestro di cappella in the Cathedral of Forlì and he was admitted in the Philharmonic Academy of Bologna.

Published works
 Twelve Sonatas for Organ, Op. 1, published in London
 Six Sonatas for the Harpsichord with an accompaniment for a Violin, Op. 2, also published in London.
Many other works remain unpublished; the manuscripts are kept in the archive of the Cathedral of Forlì.

Free scores

Discs
 Ignazio Cirri, Dodici Sonate per l'Organo, played by Andrea Macinanti and Francesco Tasini; organs by Gaetano Callido in the  Cathedral of Forlì, La Bottega Discantica, 1997.
 Ignazio Cirri, "Sei Sonate per clavicembalo con accompagnamento di violino", Ensemble Sezione Aurea, Luca Giardini violin, Filippo Pantieri harpsichord, Passacaille 2018.

References 

1711 births
1787 deaths
People from Forlì
Italian male classical composers
Italian musicians
Italian organists
Male organists
Italian Classical-period composers
18th-century Italian composers
18th-century Italian male musicians
18th-century keyboardists